Melvin James Neufeld (October 3, 1940 – August 3, 2020) was a Republican member of the Kansas House of Representatives. He represented the 115th district. Neufeld first served from 1985 to 1988, and again from 1991 to 2010, when he lost the primary election to Garrett Love.

On August 3, 2020, Neufeld died from Glioblastoma.

1994 Blackmail Scandal
In 1994, Neufeld threatened to blackmail a Democratic member of the Kansas House of Representatives if he did not vote "yes" on a pending appropriations bill.  The Kansas Supreme Court ruled that the state could not prosecute Neufeld because legislative immunity prevented a court from considering his threats as evidence.

Committee membership
Education
Federal and State Affairs (Chair)
Government Efficiency and Fiscal Oversight

Major donors
The top five donors to Neufeld's 2008 campaign:
 Kansas Dental Association - $1,000
 Monsanto - $1,000 	
 Kansas Association of Realtors - $1,000 	
 Koch Industries - $1,000 	
 Kansas Contractors Association - $1,000

References

External links
Kansas Legislature - Melvin Neufeld
Project Vote Smart profile
Kansas Votes profile
State Surge - Legislative and voting track record
Campaign contributions: 1998, 2004, 2008

Republican Party members of the Kansas House of Representatives
1940 births
2020 deaths
20th-century American politicians
21st-century American politicians
People from Gray County, Kansas